Cipra is a  surname. Notable people with the surname include:

 Angi Cipra, American gymnast
 Barry Arthur Cipra (born 1952), American mathematician and writer
 Jean Camille Cipra (1893–1952), French painter of Czech descent
 Milo Cipra (1906–1985), Croatian composer